Mount Keith is a mountain, (1,530 m), surmounting the east end of the ridge between Rastorguev Glacier and Crawford Glacier in the Bowers Mountains, a major mountain range situated in Victoria Land, Antarctica. The topographical feature was first mapped by the United States Geological Survey (USGS) from surveys and U.S. Navy air photos, 1960–65. Named by Advisory Committee on Antarctic Names (US-ACAN) for John D. Keith, builder, U.S. Navy, a member of the South Pole Station party, 1965. The mountain lies situated on the Pennell Coast, a portion of Antarctica lying between Cape Williams and Cape Adare.

References

Keith
Pennell Coast